Peer or Pir is a title for a Sufi spiritual guide. They are also referred to as a Hazrat (from ) and Sheikh or Shaykh, which is literally the Arabic equivalent. The title is often translated into English as "saint". In Sufism, a Pir's role is to guide and instruct his disciples on the Sufi path. This is often done by general lessons (called Suhbas) and individual guidance. Other words that refer to a Pir include Murshid and Sarkar.

The title Peer Baba (from ) is common in the Indian subcontinent used as a salutation to Sufi masters or similarly honored persons. After their death, people visit their tombs or mausolea, referred to as dargah or maqbara.

The path of Sufism starts when a student takes an oath of allegiance with a teacher called Bai'at or Bay'ah  (Arabic word meaning "transaction") where he swears allegiance at the hands of his Pir and repents of all his previous sins. After that, the student is called a Murid (Arabic word meaning committed one). From here, his batin (esoteric) journey starts.

A Pir usually has authorizations to be a teacher for one (or more) tariqahs. A tariqah may have more than one Pir at a time. A Pir is accorded that status by his Sheikh by way of Khilafat or Khilafah (Arabic word meaning "succession"), a process in which the Pir identifies one of his disciples as his successor, which may be more than one.

The title is also written as Pirzada or Peerzada. The people having this title also write Shah. The title is most used by Geelani Syeds. The title is common in Punjab, Kashmir, Iran, India and Afghanistan.

See also
 Spiritual direction
 Satya Pir, a folk hero
 Syed Pir Badshah, Persian author of Bengal
 Panchpiria, an ethnic group defined by their reverence for five pirs

References

Further reading
 

Persian words and phrases
Islamic honorifics
Religious leadership roles
Sufism in India
Sufism in Pakistan